Fomalhaut C, originally designated LP 876-10, is the distant third star of the Fomalhaut system. It is about five degrees from Fomalhaut, roughly halfway between it and the Helix Nebula. It is currently  from Fomalhaut A, and 3.2 light-years away from Fomalhaut B (0.987 pc). It was originally catalogued as a lone red dwarf, until October 2013, when Eric Mamajek announced that the star had a distance, velocity and color-magnitude position consistent with it being part of the Fomalhaut system. It was most likely catalogued with no relation to Fomalhaut due to the fact that it is in the Aquarius constellation, while the rest of the system are in the Piscis Austrinus constellation.

Discovery and observation

Fomalhaut C was catalogued as a high-proper-motion star by Willem Luyten in 1979, and later, in October 2013, was discovered to be part of the Fomalhaut system, giving it the name Fomalhaut C. The star has a mass of 0.2 solar mass, (0.2 M☉) while Fomalhaut A is 1.9 M☉, and Fomalhaut B is 0.7M☉. The magnitude of this star has been recorded as 12.6. With this third star being so distant, the entire Fomalhaut system may be the widest-spanning star system that has ever been discovered. In the sky, Fomalhaut C would appear very far away from Fomalhaut, which is part of the fact of how close this system is. The distance in the night sky would be 5.5°, or around 11 full moons. Due to its magnitude, you would require a telescope to observe it at home. The entire system of Fomalhaut is around 440 million years old, which is roughly a tenth of the Solar System's age.

Debris disc

In December 2013, a debris disc was discovered around this star. However, if it were beyond 40 AU, it would have been already cataloged, which gives it a radius between 10 and 40 AU.

Comets
In part with the debris disc, there are also comets orbiting Fomalhaut C. The debris disc orbiting C is sometimes referred to as a comet belt, due to some very elliptical orbits. The disc around Fomalhaut A is also thought to have many comets, as it is also elliptical, along with Fomalhaut b (the planet, not to be confused with Fomalhaut B, the star). The Fomalhaut A belt is thought to possibly be due to a close encounter with either an undiscovered exoplanet, Fomalhaut B, or Fomalhaut C. With both A and C having comet belts, the absence of one around B is a mystery. Not only does the presence of comets make the belt more elliptical, it also makes it brighter which takes a part in its discovery.

With Fomalhaut b being hidden in the comets, this leads to a hypothesis that C could have hidden exoplanets within its comets and asteroids. There is another theory that A & C have interacted which could have formed C's comet belt if the interaction involved A giving up comets and debris. With Fomalhaut B not having any discs or belts around it, it could have been unaffected by the encounter between them.

Orbit
The orbit of Fomalhaut C around A is estimated to take 20 million years to complete. Due to the age of the three stars being 440 million years, and the distance of 2.5 light-years, this would mean that Fomalhaut C has only completed a full orbit around Fomalhaut A 22 times.

See also
Fomalhaut
TW Piscis Austrini (Fomalhaut B)
Fomalhaut b

References

Aquarius (constellation)
M-type main-sequence stars
J22480446-2422075
Piscis Austrini, Alpha C